Palace Mosque is a mosque in Baku, Azerbaijan located inside of Palace of the Shirvanshahs complex. It was built in 1441–1442.

Mosques in Baku
Religious buildings and structures completed in 1442
15th-century mosques